Chinchaga Wildland Park is a protected  (80,000 hectares) tract of land in the  of the greater Chinchaga wilderness area in a disjunct outlier of the Foothills Natural Region of Alberta , in a remote area of northwest Alberta, Canada, about  west of Manning. It was designated as a Wildlife Park in December 1999. The greater Chinchaga area was identified in 1995 as an Environmentally Significant Area. It was designated by the Alberta Government as a protected area in 2000, under the "Special Places" program. "Elevations in the Park range from 650 m adjacent to the Chinchaga River to 915 m at the height of land atop Halverson Ridge."

The upper course of the Chinchaga River, which forms the Park's northern border, is a provincially Environmentally Significant Area (ESA).  The Park extends south to the slopes of Halverson Ridge. The only road that provides access is the Chinchaga Forestry Road, a high grade gravel road running west from the Mackenzie Highway.

History 
The Chinchaga area was mainly used by small populations of  First Nations and Métis for hunting.

Chinchaga Firestorm 1950 

In the spring of 1950 the watershed of the Chinchaga River experienced drought conditions that extended over boreal regions of northern Canada. At the time of the fire  Imperial Oil surveying crew were on site. The fire was caused by human activity.  Other sources theorize that slash burning from agricultural clearing could have been the initial spark.

On 1 June 1950 human activity caused a forest fire in the Chinchaga area, one of the largest if not the largest in modern North American history. The ignition point was north of Fort St. John, British Columbia. The fire burned north-eastward nearly to Keg River, Alberta and continued to burn throughout the summer and early fall until the end of October. It destroyed  of the Chinchaga area. Size estimates have varied due to the imprecise measurement techniques of the time period. While most likely not the largest fire in the history of the North American boreal forest, it produced the largest burned area of any recorded fire on the continent.

1997 
In the 1997 report commissioned by the Alberta Environmental Protection the Chinchaga Diversity Area and the Chinchaga River were designated as an Environmentally Significant Areas (ESAs).

Senate Committee Report on Boreal Forest 1999 
In June 1999, the Senate Committee on Agriculture and Forestry’s Subcommittee on the Boreal Forest published their report Competing Realities: The Boreal Forest at Risk which contained 35 recommendations intended to ensure that Canada adopt "a natural forest landscape-based approach 
to managing a boreal forest that is coming increasingly under siege."

Special Places 2000 
Under the 2000 "Special Places" program. the natural state of the area is intended to be protected, however, other uses are permitted under provincial law. Concerns have been raised about oil and gas development in parts of this wilderness area.

In 2000 both the Alberta Wildlife Society (AWS) and the Canadian Parks and Wilderness Society were disappointed with the small size and poor quality of the Chinchaga wilderness region chosen by the province of Alberta to be protected. The area protected by the province is mostly "peatland and unproductive, burned-over deciduous forest."

The area protected by the province is mostly "peatland and unproductive, burned-over deciduous forest."

The Alberta Land and Forest Division leased an additional  of the land set aside as the Chinchaga Special Place to Manning Diversified Forest Products Ltd. as a timber license. In 2000, the provincial government authorized logging by Daishowa-Marubeni and Manning Diversified Forest Products in another part of Chinchaga shortly after giving the wildpark area protected status.

The Biophysical Inventory of Chinchaga Wildland Park was released in March 2002.

In June 2002 the Alberta Government claimed it had "no plans to re-open discussion" about enlarging the Chinchaga Special Place.

In 2003 the Alberta Wilderness Association, the Federation of Alberta Naturalists, the Sierra Club of Canada, Canadian Nature Federation and the Natural Resources Defense Council in the U.S. called for a "moratorium on further development in Chinchaga until permanent protection is established."

Ecology
The environment consists of diverse landscapes and vegetation ecosystems including boreal forests and muskeg, with deciduous and coniferous forests mixed with wetlands and fens. This provides habitat for woodland caribou (Rangifer 
tarandus) and trumpeter swan (Cygnus buccinator) which are Endangered Species in Alberta and  grizzly bear (Ursus arctos). These along beaver (Castor canadensis) and northern goshawk (Accipiter gentiles), are considered to be the focal wildlife species in the Park.  Other species include including, muskrat (Ondatra zibethicus), marten (Martes americana), fisher (Martes pennant), moose (Alces alces), wolf (Canis lupus), lynx (Lynx canadensis), pileated woodpecker (Dryocopus pileatus), and numerous other small mammals, furbearers, raptors, songbirds, and waterfowl.

Boreal woodland caribou 
Caribou considered a "species "at risk" of declining due to non-viable population levels, and are designated as "threatened" under the Alberta Wildlife Act
(Alberta Environment 2001). Nationally, the status of woodland caribou varies considerably across the species’ range, with Alberta populations listed as "threatened" (Gray 1999, COSEWIC 2001)." The boreal ecotype of woodland caribou that inhabit Chinchaga Wildland Park and adjacent areas are largely restricted to peatland complexes. They require large home ranges and distinct calving and wintering areas that extend beyond the current Park boundaries. The 2002 report recommended that "habitat units that have been identified as Caribou Habitat ESAs within Chinchaga Wildland Park should also be extrapolated and managed accordingly in areas outside and adjacent to the Park."

See also
List of Alberta provincial parks
List of Canadian provincial parks
List of National Parks of Canada

Footnotes

References
 
 
 
 
 

 
  Commissioned by Alberta Community Development, Parks and Protected Areas, Valleyview, AB
 
  Report commissioned by the Resource Data Division, Alberta Environmental Protection, Edmonton, Alberta
 

Clear Hills County
Parks in Alberta
1999 establishments in Alberta
2000 establishments in Alberta